Bacabal is a city in Maranhão, Brazil. It is located approximately 250 km south of the state capital São Luís. The city proper has a population of 104,633 (IBGE 2018 estimate). It is the seat of the Roman Catholic Diocese of Bacabal.

The municipality contains a small part of the Baixada Maranhense Environmental Protection Area, a  sustainable use conservation unit created in 1991 that has been a Ramsar Site since 2000.

References

Municipalities in Maranhão